Hemaris radians is a moth of the family Sphingidae. It is known from southern Siberia, Mongolia, the southern Russian Far East, north-eastern and central-eastern China, the Korean Peninsula and Japan.

The wingspan is 37–40 mm. The forewing discal cell is longitudinally divided by a distinct or vestigial scale fold, rarely undivided. There are two forms, form mandarina and form radians. Adults are on wing from mid-May to late July in Korea.

It looks like a bee, but it is not.

The larvae have been recorded feeding on Lonicera and Rubia species in the Russian Far East and Lonicera japonica in Korea.

References

R
Moths of Asia
Moths of Japan
Insects of China
Moths described in 1856